The Great Ruby is a 1915 American silent drama film directed by Barry O'Neil, based on the play of the same name by Cecil Raleigh and Henry Hamilton.  The film stars Beatrice Morgan, Octavia Handworth, and Eleanor Barry.

Cast list

References

1915 films
1915 drama films
Films directed by Barry O'Neil
American silent feature films
1910s American films